Eugene Robert "Gene" Kotlarek (March 31, 1940 – November 9, 2017) was an American former ski jumper. He competed at the 1960 and 1964 Winter Olympics with the best result of 14th place in the normal hill in 1964.

Kotlarek was trained by his father George, a member of the American Ski Jumping Hall of Fame. He won the 1958 National Boys title, the 1959 National Junior A championship, and the U.S. Senior titles in 1963 and 1966–67. In 1964 he set a national record at 138 m (454 feet), which stood for nine years. Kotlarek graduated from the University of Minnesota and later worked as an accountant. In 1982 he was elected to the National Ski Hall of Fame.

Gene died on November 9, 2017 in Colorado Springs, CO.

References

1940 births
2017 deaths
American male ski jumpers
Olympic ski jumpers of the United States
Ski jumpers at the 1960 Winter Olympics
Ski jumpers at the 1964 Winter Olympics
Sportspeople from Duluth, Minnesota